The Southeast Asian Ceramic Society (SEACS) was founded in 1969 in Singapore. It is a member of the London-based Oriental Ceramic Society.

Description
The society was the inspiration of William Willetts who gathered together a small group of established collectors and ceramic enthusiasts including George S. Cook, Frank Hickley, Pamela Hickley, Helen Ling, Norma Lu, Margaretha Ratnam, Trevor Rutter, Jo Rutter, C. K. Sng, Lu Sinclair, Don Sinclair, Y. H. (Mathew) Wong, and Adrian Zecha. Its first elected president was Helen Ling.  She had many associates in the art world including the designer Jim Thompson; it was from the Lings' bungalow that Thompson disappeared in March 1967. The review by Henry D. Ginsburg singled out the uniqueness of their first publication and Willetts' appreciation of the aesthetic qualities of these previously unsung artefacts of the Asian ceramics world: "the world has been slow to recognize their quality."

Its members include the region's leading archaeologists. Wrecks such as the Turiang (a 14–16th century wreck) found by Sten Sjøstrand, whose ceramic cargo was studied by fellow member Roxanna Brown, have contributed to our knowledge of trade in Southeast Asia. Long-time member John Miksic was awarded Singapore's inaugural History Prize in 2018.

The historian John Guy noted that this “presentation of the then little known ceramic tradition of Thailand, Cambodia and Vietnam caused a stir amongst the oriental ceramic cognoscenti.” Furthermore, that "the Society inspired a generation of younger scholars and stimulated the interest of government archaeological departments throughout Southeast Asia.” As a consequence, ceramic societies were to emerge in ensuing years in West Malaysia, Jakarta, Manila and Hong Kong.

Other exhibitions followed: Chinese White Wares (1973), Chinese Blue & White Ceramics (1973), Chinese Celadons (1979), Khmer Ceramics 9th–14th Century (1981), Vietnamese Ceramics (1982), Song Ceramics (1983), Han Dynasty Ceramics (1991), Ceramics in Scholarly Taste (1992), each accompanied by a catalogue and most recently, a 50th anniversary commemorative exhibition (2019) held at the Singapore National Library when the society celebrated its 50th anniversary.

The society, which is based in Singapore, is open to all those interested in ceramics and particularly Southeast Asian ceramics and attracts scholars and collectors alike from around the world. It holds monthly meetings and lectures via ZOOM, participates in educational workshops, and arranges both local and overseas study trips as well as handling sessions for its Singapore-based members. The categories of membership include local, overseas and students. Many of its members are known experts in their fields and their publications are listed on the society's website.

Presidents
1969–70 Helen Ling
1970–73 William Willetts
1973–75 George S. Cook
1975–78 Don R. H. Sinclair
1978–80 S. R. Parker
1980–81 Lu Yaw
1981–84 A. P. Rajah
1984–87 Earl Lu
1987–90 Steven Tan
1990–93 Kenson Kwok
1993–96 Lise Young Lai
1996–99 Pamela Hickley
1999-02 Lam Pin Foo
2002–05 Margaret Wang
2005–08 Marjorie Chu
2008–12 Alvin Chia
2012–17 Ingrid C. Hanson
2017–20 Patricia Bjaaland Welch
2020–21 Audrey Toh
2021–22 John N. Miksic

Publications
Chinese Blue and White Ceramics, Singapore, 1978
Chinese Celadons and Other Related Wares in Southeast Asia, 1979
Chinese White Wares, 1973
Khmer Ceramics, 1981, 
Lau, Aileen (ed.), Spirit of Han, 1991, 
Lu Yaw (ed.), Song Ceramics, 1983
Miksic, John N (ed), New Light on Old Pottery, 2009, 
Rinaldi, Maura, Ceramics in Scholarly Taste, 1993, 
Young, Carol M. et al., Vietnamese Ceramics, 1982, 
Welch, Patricia Bjaaland, Southeast Asian Ceramic Society 1969–2019, 2019, 
Willets, William, An Angkor Roundabout, 2017
Willetts, William, Ceramic Art of Southeast Asia, 1971

References

1969 establishments in Singapore
Ceramic art
Arts organizations established in 1969
Learned societies of Singapore